José Utrera Molina (1926–2017) was a Spanish politician who served as assistant Secretary of Labor, Minister of Housing and Minister Secretary General of the Movement.

Career 
Molina was born in Malaga, and completed his studies in the University of Granada.
Molina served during the Spanish State of Franco as civil governor of several Spanish provinces.
During the final years of the Francoist State he was in charge of important political offices.

After the death of Franco and Spain's transition to democracy, Molina was a controversial figure. He died at age 91 in 2017.

Honours 
Knight Grand Cross in the Order of Charles III.
Knight Grand Cross in the Order of Civil Merit.
Knight Grand Cross in the Order of Alfonso X the Wise.
Knight Grand Cross in the Imperial Order of the Yoke and Arrows.
Knight Grand Cross in the Order of Cisneros.
Knight Grand Cross of the Order of Agricultural Merit.
Grand Cross of the Military Merit.
Grand Cross of the Naval Merit.
Grand Cross of the Aeronautical Merit.
Nicaragua: Knight Grand Cross in the Order of the Cultural Independence Rubén Dario.

References

People from Málaga
1926 births
2017 deaths
University of Granada alumni
Housing ministers of Spain
FET y de las JONS politicians
Francoists